Satish Rajwade  (born 9 January 1973) is an Indian Marathi film and television director and writer. He has also acted in few Hindi films and Marathi television series.

Career
Rajwade started his career with acting in various Hindi and Marathi films along with theatre. He then moved to television as a director and writer. He has also worked as an assistant to director Govind Nihalani.

Rajwade got interested in acting after mother sent him to an acting workshop for kids during his summer. To pursue a career in acting, he joined Mithibai College, Vile Parle. During his college years, he acted in 75 one-act plays for his college in Marathi, Hindi, English as well as Gujarati for which he won many awards including the INT Best Actor in a Comic Role award for a Marathi one-act play Aambaa. The Best Comic Actor award fetched Satish Rajwade a role in his first professional play Tur Tur by Kedar Shinde. But his first big break came when he was spotted by Mahesh Manjrekar and Mohan Wagh and was offered a role in All The Best, which had 890 shows. A casting director spotted Satish Rajwade during one of these performances and offered him a role in a Hindi film. Rajwade then went on to play small roles in various Hindi Films like Sanshodhan, Hazaar Chaurasi Ki Maa, Nidaan, Vaastav and Josh.Rajwade  then started working in the editing studios of B.R.Chopra without a salary for almost a year. Soon he wanted to be a director. Along with his friend Naveen Upadhyay, he directed his first pilot episode starring Mohan Joshi and Reema Lagoo. Blaze Music Company liked their work and offered him to direct a music video Na Jaane Kyun starring model Sameer Dharmadhikari which became an instant hit on the music charts.

Pleased with the success of the music video, Blaze Music Company CEOs offered to let Satish Rajwade direct the marathi movie, Mrugjal, which went on to bag 23 awards. Rajwade went on to direct his first serial Duniyadari, for Zee Marathi, which was followed by Kinara and Reshim Gaathi. He co-directed Oon Pawus for which he also won the Ma. Ta. Sanmaan Best Director award. He then directed Asambhav and later went on to direct the first 30 episodes of Weg on Saam Marathi. He later directed Agnihotra on Star Pravah and  Guntata Hriday He & Eka Lagnachi Dusri Goshta on Zee Marathi. He has also worked on many projects with actress Mukta Barve.

His latest film Badam Rani Gulam Chor is based on popular Marathi play Makdachya Haati Champagne (literally: Champagne in the hands of a monkey) and features Upendra Limaye, Mukta Barve, Pushkar Shotri and Anand Ingale in lead roles. His last release was Preamachi Goshta. He  has also acted in movie Bhay and Time Barvait.

Filmography

References

External links 
 

Marathi film directors
Indian television directors
Living people
1973 births
Film directors from Mumbai
21st-century Indian film directors
Indian male screenwriters